Princess Lalla Khadija of Morocco (born 28 February 2007) is the younger child of King Mohammed VI of Morocco and his wife, Princess Lalla Salma. Lalla Khadija's elder brother is Moulay Hassan, Crown Prince of Morocco.

Ancestry

References

2007 births
Living people
Moroccan princesses
Royal children
People from Rabat
Daughters of kings